Jazz Spectacular is Frankie Laine's fifteenth 12" long-play album, recorded in 1955 and released early in 1956. This is a Frankie Laine theme album, the theme being jazz, recorded with jazz trumpeter Buck Clayton, pianist Sir Charles Thompson, tenor-saxophonist Budd Johnson, trombonist Urbie Green, and guest trombonists J. J. Johnson and Kai Winding.

Billboard magazine stated Laine cut the album while rushing back and forth between his act at New York's Latin Quarter.

Track listing

References

External links 
The Frankie Laine discography

Frankie Laine albums
1955 albums
Columbia Records albums